Sericosema wilsonensis is a species of geometrid moth in the family Geometridae. It is found in North America.

The MONA or Hodges number for Sericosema wilsonensis is 6674.

References

Further reading

 

Caberini
Articles created by Qbugbot
Moths described in 1922